Yankan is a rural locality (a selo) in Solovyovsky Selsoviet of Tyndinsky District, Amur Oblast, Russia. The population was 53 as of 2018. There is 1 street.

Geography 
Yankan is located 140 km south of Tynda (the district's administrative centre) by road. Solovyovsk is the nearest rural locality.

References 

Rural localities in Tyndinsky District